The Assistant Deputy Director of National Intelligence for Open Source (ADDNI/OS) is a senior-level position within the Office of the Director of National Intelligence, responsible for developing strategic direction, establishing policy and managing fiscal resources for Open Source Intelligence, providing oversight for the DNI Open Source Center, as well as document and media exploitation for the United States Intelligence Community.

References